
Year 570 (DLXX) was a common year starting on Wednesday (link will display the full calendar) of the Julian calendar. The denomination 570 for this year has been used since the early medieval period, when the Anno Domini calendar era became the prevalent method in Europe for naming years.

Events 
 By place 
 Europe 
 Battle of Gwen Ystrad: A British alliance is forged between the kingdoms of Strathclyde, Bryneich and Elmet (approximate date).
 Spoleto becomes the capital of an independent duchy, under the Lombard chieftain Faroald (approximate date).
 Leutfred becomes duke of Alemannia (modern Germany).

 Persia 
 Ctesiphon, capital of the Sassanid Empire, becomes the largest city in the world, taking the lead from Constantinople, capital of the Byzantine Empire.

 Arabia 
 Muhammad, Islamic prophet, is born in Mecca (today's Saudi Arabia). His father Abdullah ibn Abd al-Muttalib dies a few months before his birth, so he and his mother Aminah bint Wahb are protected by Muhammad's paternal grandfather, Abdul Muttalib who is recognized as the leading figure in his tribe the Quraysh. 
 Abraha, Christian ruler of coastal Yemen, who was acting as a general for the Christian kingdom in Abyssinia, begins a military expedition in Arabia against the predominantly pagan Quraysh of Mecca, known as the Year of the Elephant.

 By topic 
 Religion 
 A limestone statue of Boddhisattva is created in Henan (approximate date).
 The first mention is made of the Spear of Destiny (approximate date).
 The Jews of Clermont-Ferrand are forced to convert to Christianity.
 Year of the Elephant, according to Islamic tradition.

Births 
 Ammar ibn Yasir, companion of Muhammad and Ali ibn Abi Talib (d. 657)
 Chen Yuan, crown prince of the Chen Dynasty (approximate date)
 Childebert II, king of Austrasia (d. 595)
 Gao Heng, emperor of Northern Qi (d. 577) 
 Imerius of Immertal, Swiss monk (approximate date)
 Li Dashi, Chinese official and historian (d. 628)
 Muhammad, founder of Islam (d. 632) (approximate date)
 Namri Songtsen, king of Tibet (approximate date)
 Pei Ji, chancellor of the Tang Dynasty (d. 629) 
 Pybba, king of Mercia (approximate date)
 Rigunth, daughter of Chilperic I (d. 585)
 Theodelinda, queen of the Lombards (d. 628)

Deaths 
 January 15 – Íte of Killeedy, Irish nun 
 Abdullah ibn Abd al Muttalib, father of Muhammad (b. 545)
Abraha, an Aksumite army general, Islamic tradition places his death immediately after his expedition to the Hejaz
 Antonina, wife of Belisarius (approximate date)
 Armel, Breton prince and bishop (approximate date)
 Fei Di, emperor of the Chen Dynasty
 Gildas, British cleric (approximate date)
 John Philoponus, Aristotelian commentator (b. 490)
 Soga no Iname, leader of the Soga clan 
 Zhang Yao'er, empress dowager of the Chen Dynasty (b. 506)

References